The Second Sacred War was the Spartan defeat of Phocians at Delphi and the restoration of Delphian self-control.

In 458 or 457BC, Phocians captured three towns in the Spartan metropolis of Doris.  A Spartan army marched on Doris, defeated the Phocians, and restored Dorian rule.  On their way back to Peloponnese, Athenians attacked the Spartan army but were repelled, and the Spartans returned home.  After the Five Years Truce, Sparta embarked on a campaign of truncating "Athens' imperialistic ambitions in Central Greece".

The Second Sacred War was a conflict over the occupation of the Temple of Apollo at Delphi: Spartans quickly removed the Athenian-backed Phocians and returned stewardship to the Delphians.  After the Spartans left, however, an Athenian army—led by Pericles—took the city and re-installed Phocian rule.

Accepting the writings of Philochorus, a group of historians led by Karl Julius Beloch, Benjamin Dean Meritt, Theodore Wade-Gery, and Malcolm Francis McGregor argued that the Spartan ejection of the Phocians occurred in 449BC, and that the Athenians re-installed them in 447BC.  They were opposed by historians led by Arnold Wycombe Gomme and Felix Jacoby who, rejecting Philochorus' chronology, assert that both marches on Delphi happened in 448BC.

This Sacred War and the Third were the only two to be referred to as such in classical antiquity.  , there was no extant evidence that these changes in Delphian governance had any effect on pilgrims to Pythia.

References

440s BC conflicts
Sacred
First Peloponnesian War
wars involving Sparta